Cliniodes underwoodi is a moth in the family Crambidae. It was described by Herbert Druce in 1899. It is found in Costa Rica, Nicaragua and Mexico (north to Michoacan). It is also found on Jamaica.

Adults have been recorded on wing year round except December.

References

Moths described in 1899
Eurrhypini